Return to Ithaca is a 2014 comedy-drama film directed by Laurent Cantet. The film premiered at the 71st Venice International Film Festival. It was screened in the Special Presentations section of the 2014 Toronto International Film Festival.

Plot
Five friends reunite on a rooftop terrace in Havana to celebrate the return of Amadeo after his 16 years of self-exile in Spain. During the night, they sing, dance, reflect the past and make sense of the present.

Cast 
 Jorge Perugorría as Eddy
 Isabel Santos as Tania
 Fernando Hechavarría as Rafa
 Néstor Jiménez as Amadeo
 Pedro Julio Díaz Ferran as Aldo

Accolades
The film won the Venice Days Award at the 71st Venice International Film Festival.

References

External links 
 

2014 films
French comedy-drama films
2014 comedy-drama films
2010s Spanish-language films
Films directed by Laurent Cantet
2010s French films